Starquest II is a 1997 science fiction thriller film written and directed by Fred Gallo.

Premise

After a nuclear war, four warriors from Earth awaken on a space ship. They must save the Earth from being taken over by extraterrestrials who will do anything to save their race.

Cast
 Adam Baldwin –Lee
 Robert Englund –Father O'Neill
 Duane Davis –Cpl. Charles Devon
 Kate Rodger –Susan
 Gretchen Palmer –Carrie
 Jeannie Millar –Jenna
 Jolie Jackunas –Cpl. Kelly
 Jerry Trimble –Trit
 Maria Ford –Dancer in Flashback
 Shauna O'Brien –Dancer in Flashback

References

 BFI
 

1997 films
American science fiction action films
Films directed by Fred Gallo
American thriller films
1990s science fiction films
1990s English-language films
1990s American films